Sacré-Cœur-de-Jésus was a former parish municipality in the Joliette Regional County Municipality in the Lanaudière region of Quebec.

On February 2, 1991, it changed its name and its status to the municipality of Sacré-Cœur-de-Crabtree to avoid confusion with a different parish municipality also called Sacré-Cœur-de-Jésus, in the Chaudière-Appalaches region.  On October 23, 1996, Sacré-Cœur-de-Crabtree and the municipality of Crabtree (formerly a village, until June 12, 1993) amalgamated to form a new municipality, the modern-day municipality of Crabtree, Quebec.

References

Former municipalities in Quebec
Populated places disestablished in 1991